The Governor of the Administrative Arrondissement of Brussels-Capital (French: Gouverneur de Bruxelles-Capitale, Dutch: Gouverneur van Brussel-Hoofdstad) has the responsibility to enforce laws concerned with public order in the Brussels-Capital Region, one of the three regions of Belgium. The governor's powers are actually quite limited. Just as the Governors of the provinces of Belgium he heads the coordination of all necessary actions and all emergency services during the provincial phase of a disaster on the territory of the Brussels-Capital Region.

The Governor of Brussels-Capital should be confused with neither the Minister-President of the Brussels-Capital Region nor with the mayor of the City of Brussels, which is one of the 19 municipalities of Brussels.

The regional government also appoints the Vice-Governor, who must have a considerable knowledge of both the French and the Dutch language and who must ensure that the legislation regarding the use of languages is observed in Brussels.

The agreement following the 2011 state reform includes the removal of this post and the post was abolished in 2014. Instead, there is a high official appointed by the Brussels Government.

List of governors
André Degroeve, 1 January 1995 – 30 April 1998
Raymonde Dury, May 1998 – 13 November 1998
Véronique Paulus de Châtelet, 22 December 1998 – 1 January 2009
Hugo Nys (acting), 1 January 2009 – October 2010
Jean Clément (acting), October 2010 –

References

External links 
Brussels-Capital Region. Centre d'Informatique pour la Région Bruxelloise (Brussels Regional Informatics Center)
Official site, available in French and Dutch

Government of Brussels